Bṛhat-saṃhitā is a 6th-century Sanskrit-language encyclopedia compiled by Varāhamihira in present-day Ujjain, India. Besides the author's area of expertise—astrology and astronomy—the work contains a wide variety of other topics.

Contents 

According to the penultimate verse of the text, it contains 100 chapters in less than 4000 shlokas (verses). Sudhakara Dvivedi's edition of the text, with Utpala's commentary, contains 105 chapters, plus the last chapter containing the table of contents; H. Kern's edition contains an additional chapter (#36) titled Raja-lakshnam. According to Utpala, Varahamihira excludes five chapters from the contents, thus arriving at 100 as the number of chapters; However, Varahamihira himself excludes 3 more chapters from the table of contents, bringing the number of chapters to only 97; so, it is not clear how exactly is the number 100 is arrived at.

Utpala cites the authorship of one of the excluded chapters to Vidhya-vasin. He also declares four verses to be spurious, and does not comment on two additional verses, which suggests that these may be later interpolations.

The contents of the text fall into two major categories: anga and upanga. The anga discusses divination based on planets, asterisms, and zodiac signs. The upanga discusses a wide variety of other topics, as listed above. Varāhamihira does not discuss several traditional topics which he considers legendary and unscientific.

The text displays Varāhamihira's skill as a poet: it  uses at least 63 different metres (Arya being the most frequent) in the Brihat-samhita.

Influence 

Varāhamihira's text became far more popular than earlier similar texts, because of its comprehensiveness, lucidity, appealing presentation, and literary merit. He wrote an abridged version of the text, Samāsa Saṃhitā, which is now lost and is known only from Utpala's commentary on Brhat-samhita.

According to Varāhamihira, in some verses he was merely summarizing earlier existing literature on astronomy, Shilpa Sastra and temple architecture, yet his presentation of different theories and models of design are among the earliest texts that have survived.

Several chapters of the text - such as Chitraymayura, Drgargala (Jalagala-shastra) and Prasada-lakshana - were studied as independent treatises by later scholars, who regarded Varāhamihira as an authority on a variety of topics. 11th-century Iranian scholar Al-Biruni also quotes Brhat-samhita.

Abd Al-Aziz ibn Shams ibn Baha' Nuri Dihlavwi (fl. c. 1350/1375) composed Tarjamah i Barahi, a Persian translation of Brhat-samhita, for the Delhi Sultan Firuz Shah Tughluq.

For modern scholars, the wide range of the text makes it a very useful source of history about the contempoary period.

Editions 

Printed editions and translations of the text include:

 1895-97, Varanasi: Edited with Bhattotpala's commentary by Sudhakara Dvivedi (2 volumes)
 1865, Calcutta: Edited by H. Kern
 1870-1875: English translation by H. Kern in Journal of the Royal Asiatic Society
 1947, Bangalore: Text with English translation by V. Subrahmanya Sastri and M. Ramakrishna Bhat (2 volumes)

Notes

References

Bibliography

External links 

 Sanskrit text and English translation (1946) by V. Subrahmanya Sastri and M. Ramakrishna Bhat
 Sanskrit text (1865) edited by H. Kern

Works by Varāhamihira
Sanskrit encyclopedias
Indian encyclopedias